Patricia Barbara Lowe-Cropper  (born 15 September 1943) is a British middle-distance runner. She competed in the 800 metres at the 1968 Summer Olympics and the 1972 Summer Olympics. She was appointed MBE in the 1974 Birthday Honours.

She also represented England at the 1966 British Empire and Commonwealth Games in Kingston, Jamaica. Four years later she won a silver medal in the 800 metres, at the 1970 British Commonwealth Games in Edinburgh, Scotland. In 1974 she competed in her third consecutive Games at the 1974 British Commonwealth Games in Christchurch, New Zealand.

References

1943 births
Living people
Athletes (track and field) at the 1968 Summer Olympics
Athletes (track and field) at the 1972 Summer Olympics
British female middle-distance runners
Olympic athletes of Great Britain
Athletes (track and field) at the 1966 British Empire and Commonwealth Games
Athletes (track and field) at the 1970 British Commonwealth Games
Commonwealth Games medallists in athletics
Commonwealth Games silver medallists for England
Members of the Order of the British Empire
Sportspeople from Leicester
Medallists at the 1970 British Commonwealth Games